Georg Harding (born 30 August 1981) is an Austrian football coach and a former player.

Career
Harding began his Career with TSV Neumarkt, here played with the team between 1995. Now joined to the Academy from FC Kärnten than in the year 1998 was promoted from Head Coach August Starek and played his first games in the Erste Liga. In the season 2001/2002 joined to lower League club SK Treibach, here played two season and moved than in 2003 to Red Zac Erste Liga DSV Leoben. He played with DSV Leoben 115 games and scores 4 games, before transferred to SK Rapid Wien in 2007. In January 2009 was on trial at SV Wehen Wiesbaden of the German 2. Bundesliga, the transfer failed and he turned back to SK Rapid Wien.

References

External links
 Rapid Profile
 

1981 births
Living people
People from Steyr
Austrian footballers
SK Rapid Wien players
FC Wacker Innsbruck (2002) players
Austrian Football Bundesliga players
Association football midfielders
Footballers from Upper Austria
LASK players
DSV Leoben players
FC Kärnten players